Beit Ur al-Fauqa is a Palestinian village located in the Ramallah and al-Bireh Governorate of the State of Palestine, in the northern West Bank,  west of Ramallah and  southeast of Beit Ur al-Tahta. According to the Palestinian Central Bureau of Statistics, it had a population of 864 in the 2007 census.

Location and geography

It is bordered by Beituniya to the east, Deir Ibzi to the north, Beit Ur at-Tahta and Kharbatha al-Misbah to the west, and at-Tira and Beit Anan to the south.

For many centuries, the villages occupying their sites dominated one of the most historic roads in history. The ridge continues for another  arriving at the plateau to the north of al-Jib (biblical Gibeon).

History

Ancient period 

Beit Ur al-Fauqa (meaning "Upper House of Straw") has been identified as the site of Upper Bethoron. The modern Arabic name preserves part of the biblical name for the village, believed to be the namesake of the Canaanite deity Horon. 

Archaeological findings indicate that Lower Bethoron (Beit Ur al-Tahta) was established before Upper Bethoron; potsherds found in Beit Ur al-Fauqa date from the Iron Age onward, while potsherds from the lower town date from the Late Bronze Age. A large birkeh (pond) north-east in the village is cut in rock.

Classical period 
Upper Bethoron was the site of three battles of the Jewish Maccabean Revolt against the Seleucid Empire. According to 1 Maccabees, Judas Maccabeus defeated the Syrian general Seron at Lower Bethoron. Six years later, Nicanor, retreating from Jerusalem, was defeated and slain at the site. In the third attempt, Bacchides succeeded in subduing the Hasmoneans and fortified this strategic pass. 

In 66 CE, It was in the ravines near Bethoron were the 12th Roman Legion under Cestius Gallus was destroyed at the start of the First Jewish–Roman War. After the subjugation of the revolt in 70 CE, the Romans built a fortress in the town to guard the road to Jerusalem. During the later Roman period and under the Byzantines, Upper Bethoron lost its importance, becoming a small village by the 5th century CE.

Medieval period 
The village has been identified with the  Bethoron Superior or Vetus Betor in the Crusader era. Melisende, Queen of Jerusalem gave it as a fief to Mar Saba.  In 1165/64 CE, it was sold to the canons of the Holy Sepulchre. The remains of a tower, Al-Burj, in the village is dated to this era.

An Arabic inscription with a verse from the Qur'an was found on a ruined stone structure in Beit Ur al-Fauqa and is attributed by Moshe Sharon to the Ayyubid period of rule in Palestine.

Ottoman period 
Beit Ur al-Fauqa, like the rest of Palestine, was incorporated into the Ottoman Empire in 1517, and in the census of 1596, the village appeared as being in the Nahiya of Quds of the Liwa of Quds. It had a population of 5 Muslim households and paid a fixed tax rate of 25% on various agricultural products, including wheat, barley, olives, goats and/or beehives; a total of  535 akçe.

In 1838 it was noted as a Muslim  village, located in the Beni Malik area, west of Jerusalem.

The French explorer Victor Guérin  visited the village in 1863, and he described it as having about 150 inhabitants, and surrounded by gardens of olive trees. He also noted the remains of a small castle. An official Ottoman village list from about 1870 showed that Bet Ur el-Foqa had 53 houses and a population of 159, though it only counted the men.

In 1883, the PEF's Survey of Western Palestine described Beit Ur Al Foka as "A small village built of stone at the end of a spur on a knoll.	The ground falls very steeply to the west.	The water supply is artificial, and on the north and south are deep valleys. The west view is very extensive, including the sea, the plains of Lydda and Ramleh, and part of the valley of Ajalon."

British Mandate period 

In the 1922 census of Palestine conducted by the British Mandate authorities, Beit 'Ur al-Fuqa had a population of 147, all Muslim. By the time of the 1931 census, Beit 'Ur al-Fauqa had 47 occupied houses and a population of 173, still all Muslim.

Of this,  were allocated for plantations and irrigable land,  for cereals, while  were classified as built-up (urban) areas.

Jordanian period 
In the wake of the 1948 Arab–Israeli War, and after the 1949 Armistice Agreements, Beit Ur al-Fauqa came under Jordanian rule.

The Jordanian census of 1961 found 362 inhabitants here.

Post 1967
Since the Six-Day War in 1967, Beit Ur al-Fauqa had been under Israeli occupation. The population of Beit Ur Fouqa in the 1967 census conducted by the Israeli authorities was 298, of whom 37 originated from the Israeli territory.

After the 1995 Oslo II Accord, 12.1% of village land was classified as Area B, while the remaining 87.9% was classified as Area C. Israel has confiscated  of land from the village in order to construct the Israeli settlement of Beit Horon.

After a settlement road denied them land access to their school, the children of the village now commute to the local al-Tira Beit Ur al-Fuqa high school, which is surrounded by the Israeli separation wall on three sides, through sewage channels. Many village families use to dwell in nearby caves, but to improve their lives they built homes, many of which are now subject to a demolition order after Israel decided to define their area as an archaeological site.

Notable people
Here was born and still lives Mrs Muftiyah Tlaib, grandmother of US congresswoman Rashida Tlaib.

References

Bibliography

 
 

 
 
  (p. 398)

External links
Welcome To Bayt 'Ur al-Fauqa
Beit ‘Ur al-Foqa, Welcome to Palestine 
Survey of Western Palestine, Map 17:  IAA, Wikimedia commons 
 Beit ‘Ur al Fauqa Village (Fact Sheet),   Applied Research Institute–Jerusalem (ARIJ)
 Beit ‘Ur al Fauqa Village Profile, ARIJ
Beit Ur al-Fauqa, aerial view, ARIJ
Locality Development Priorities and Needs in Beit ‘Ur al Fauqa Village, ARIJ

Bronze Age sites in the State of Palestine
Villages in the West Bank
Ramallah and al-Bireh Governorate
Ancient Jewish settlements of Judaea
Municipalities of the State of Palestine